This list comprises the world's largest companies by consolidated revenue, according to the Fortune Global 500 2022 rankings. American retail corporation Walmart has been the world's largest company by revenue since 2014.

The list is limited to the top 50 companies, all of which except Elevance Health have annual revenues exceeding US$140 billion. This list is incomplete, as not all companies disclose their information to the media and/or general public.

List

Notes

See also

 List of largest companies in the United States by revenue
 List of largest private non-governmental companies by revenue
 Forbes Global 2000
 List of largest employers
 List of public corporations by market capitalization
 List of most valuable brands
 List of companies by research and development spending
 List of wealthiest religious organizations
 Economy of the United States
 List of the largest software companies
 List of largest Internet companies
 List of largest technology companies by revenue
 Largest airlines in the world

References

External links
 Fortune Global 500 List

 
Largest companies by revenue